Kathakne is an unincorporated community in Southeast Fairbanks Census Area, Alaska, United States.  Its name is derived from an Indian language.  Its elevation is 1,696 feet (517 m).  The community is situated on the northeastern shore of Fish Lake, 3 miles (5 km) east of Northway, near the Northway Airport.

References

Unincorporated communities in Southeast Fairbanks Census Area, Alaska
Unincorporated communities in Alaska
Unincorporated communities in Unorganized Borough, Alaska